Andrew Houston Longino (May 16, 1854 – February 24, 1942) was an American politician from Mississippi who served as a Democrat in the Mississippi State Senate (1880–1884), the U.S. District Attorney's (1888–1890), and Governor's offices (1900–1904).

Early life and education
Longino was born in Lawrence County, Mississippi. He attained education at Mississippi College, where he graduated in 1875, and at the University of Virginia, where he earned a law degree in 1880.

The surname Longino is of Italian origin, although his family had resided in the American South since the eighteenth century. Longino was one of the first Americans of Italian descent to serve as a governor.

Political career and death
During his term as governor, Longino began a campaign to attract new industries to the state. He supervised designing and building a new Mississippi State Capitol still in use today. Also of note, the Mississippi Department of Archives and History was created and a new penitentiary at Parchman Farm was constructed during his administration.

Governor Longino invited president Theodore Roosevelt to a bear hunt in the Mississippi Delta, an event which inspired the creation of the teddy bear.

Longino died at age 87 and was interred at Cedar Lawn Cemetery in Jackson, Mississippi.

References

External links 
 
 Profile at National Governors Association website

1854 births
1942 deaths
Democratic Party governors of Mississippi
Democratic Party Mississippi state senators
University of Virginia School of Law alumni
Politicians from Jackson, Mississippi
People from Lawrence County, Mississippi
American people of Scotch-Irish descent
Mississippi College alumni
Lawyers from Jackson, Mississippi
United States Attorneys for the Southern District of Mississippi
American people of Italian descent